Lake Vanamõisa (Lake Nigula) is a lake of Estonia.

See also
List of lakes of Estonia
 

Vanamoisa
Häädemeeste Parish
Landforms of Pärnu County